Pouteria benai is a species of plant in the family Sapotaceae. It is endemic to French Guiana.

References

Endemic flora of French Guiana
benai
Vulnerable plants
Taxonomy articles created by Polbot
Taxa named by André Aubréville
Taxa named by François Pellegrin